The Reynolds–Scherman House is a historic house located at 71 Hardscrable Road in the borough of Bernardsville in Somerset County, New Jersey. It was added to the National Register of Historic Places on April 29, 1989, for its significance in architecture, industry, and literature.

History and description
The two and one-half story stone building was possibly built in the 18th century. During the American Revolutionary War, it may have been used as a storehouse for the nearby New Jersey Brigade encampment in the winter of 1779–80. Samuel Reynolds, local land owner and businessman, converted it into his home after purchasing the property in 1832. The conversion featured "eye-brow" windows. In 1928, it became the country residence of Harry Scherman, a co-founder of the Book of the Month Club, who remodeled it using Colonial Revival style.

See also
 National Register of Historic Places listings in Somerset County, New Jersey

References

Bernardsville, New Jersey
Stone houses in New Jersey
Colonial Revival architecture in New Jersey
National Register of Historic Places in Somerset County, New Jersey
Houses on the National Register of Historic Places in New Jersey
New Jersey Register of Historic Places
Houses in Somerset County, New Jersey